The 2021 Biella Challenger Indoor IV was a professional tennis tournament played on hard courts. It was the 4th edition of the tournament which was part of the 2021 ATP Challenger Tour. It took place in Biella, Italy between 15 and 21 March 2021.

Singles main-draw entrants

Seeds

 1 Rankings are as of 8 March 2021.

Other entrants
The following players received wildcards into the singles main draw:
  Flavio Cobolli
  Matteo Gigante
  Stefano Napolitano

The following player received entry into the singles main draw using a protected ranking:
  Dustin Brown

The following players received entry into the singles main draw as alternates:
  Quentin Halys
  Tobias Kamke
  Zdeněk Kolář

The following players received entry from the qualifying draw:
  Matthias Bachinger
  Jonáš Forejtek
  Daniel Masur
  Akira Santillan

The following players received entry as lucky losers:
  Nicola Kuhn
  Jack Sock

Champions

Singles

 Daniel Masur def.  Matthias Bachinger 6–3, 6–7(8–10), 7–5.

Doubles

 Lloyd Glasspool /  Matt Reid def.  Denys Molchanov /  Sergiy Stakhovsky 6–3, 6–4.

References

2021 ATP Challenger Tour
2021 in Italian tennis
March 2021 sports events in Italy
Biella Challenger Indoor